Carson Everett Williams (born June 25, 2003) is an American professional baseball and shortstop in the Tampa Bay Rays organization.

Amateur career
Williams grew up in San Diego, California and attended Torrey Pines High School. As a senior, he batted .495 with 11 home runs and 34 stolen bases. Williams committed to played college baseball for the University of California.

Professional career
Williams was selected 28th overall in the 2021 Major League Baseball draft by the Tampa Bay Rays. Williams signed with the Rays for a $2.35 million signing bonus.

Williams made his professional debut with the Rookie-level Florida Complex League Rays, slashing .282/.404/.436 with four doubles, eight RBIs, 13 strikeouts and six walks over 39 at-bats. 

He opened the 2022 season with the Charleston RiverDogs of the Single-A Carolina League. He was named the 2022 MiLB Gold Glove as the best defensive shortstop in the minor leagues.

References

External links

Baseball players from San Diego
Baseball pitchers
Baseball shortstops
Living people
2003 births
Florida Complex League Rays players
Charleston RiverDogs players